Ang Mo Kio Public Library (Simplified Chinese: 宏茂桥社区图书馆) is one of the 26 public libraries established by the National Library Board of Singapore.

Located along Ang Mo Kio Avenue 6 within walking distance of Yio Chu Kang MRT station, it serves the residents of the surrounding Ang Mo Kio GRC. As a standalone two-storey building, the library is a prominent landmark in central Ang Mo Kio.

History

Ang Mo Kio Community Library was officially opened on 17 August 1985 by Yeo Toon Chia, then Member of Parliament for Ang Mo Kio GRC, and was opened to the public on 19 August. The library was closed in March 2002 for renovation, and was officially reopened on 5 January 2003 by Vivian Balakrishnan, then Minister of State for National Development. Its name was changed to Ang Mo Kio Public Library.

Layout
Covering an area of 4,277 m2, the library spans two levels and serves the residents of Ang Mo Kio GRC, which consists of Chong Boon, Ang Mo Kio, Kebun Baru and Yio Chu Kang.

First floor
Children's collection
Adult fiction
Magazines
Cafe Galilee

Second floor
Young people's collection
Adult non-fiction
Indian Library Services - containing the most comprehensive collection of Tamil print and audiovisual material among Singapore's libraries.
Chinese and Malay collections
Quiet Reading Room (Newspapers)

References

External links 
 National Library Board

1985 establishments in Singapore
Library buildings completed in 1985
Libraries established in 1985
Libraries in Singapore
Buildings and structures in Ang Mo Kio
20th-century architecture in Singapore